The 1980 Winter Olympics, officially known as the XIII Olympic Winter Games, were a winter multi-sport event held in Lake Placid, New York, United States, from February 13 to February 24. A total of 1,072 athletes from 37 nations participated in 38 events from 10 different sports.  

Athletes from 19 countries won at least one medal, and athletes from 11 secured at least one gold medal. After winning a then-record 13 gold medals in the 1976 Winter Olympics, the Soviet Union led with 10 gold medals in 1980, and had the second most total medals with 22. East Germany led the overall medal count with 23.  The host United States were third in both gold and overall medals, with 6 and 12, respectively. Having won her country's first Olympic medal in Innsbruck, four years before, alpine skier Hanni Wenzel won Liechtenstein's only two gold medals in the country's history, at Lake Placid. Liechtenstein is the smallest nation to ever win a gold medal at the Olympics. Bulgaria won its first Winter Olympic medal at these Games, a bronze medal in cross-country skiing.  The People's Republic of China made their first appearance at a Winter Olympics at these Games, but failed to win any medals.

American Eric Heiden led all athletes with five medals, all gold, in speed skating.  Heiden was the first athlete to win five gold medals in individual events in a single Olympics, Summer or Winter.  Five other athletes won three medals each at these Games.


Medal table

The medal table is based on information provided by the International Olympic Committee (IOC) and is consistent with IOC convention in its published medal tables. By default, the table is ordered by the number of gold medals won by a National Olympic Committee. The number of silver medals is taken into consideration next and then the number of bronze medals. If nations are still tied, equal ranking is given and they are listed alphabetically.  Medals won in team competitions—such as ice hockey—are counted only once, no matter how many athletes won medals as part of the team.

In the normal hill event in ski jumping, two silver medals were awarded for a second place tie.  No bronze medal was awarded for that event.  In the men's 1000 meters speed skating event, two bronze medals were awarded for a third place tie.

See also
 1980 Winter Paralympics medal table
 1980 Summer Olympics medal table
 Miracle on Ice

References

External links
 
 
 
 

Medal count
Winter Olympics medal tables
New York (state) sports-related lists